The 2018 Prix de l'Arc de Triomphe was a horse race which was held at Longchamp on Sunday 7 October 2018. The race was run at Longchamp Racecourse for the first time since 2015, having been staged at Chantilly Racecourse in 2016 and 2017 while Longchamp was closed for major redevelopment. It was the 97th running of the Prix de l'Arc de Triomphe.

Full result

 Abbreviations: snk = short neck; nk = neck, dist = distance

References

External links
 Colour Chart – Arc 2018

2018 in horse racing
 2018
2018 in French sport
2018 in Paris
October 2018 sports events in France